The Battle of Sculeni was fought on 29 June 1821 in Sculeni, Moldavia between Ottoman forces and the Greek revolutionary forces raised by the Filiki Eteria led by Prince George Katakouzenos. The battle came about as the result of Ottoman reprisals for Alexander Ypsilantis' expedition in the two Danubian Principalities, and followed in the aftermath of the Battle of Dragashani.  When the Ottomans crossed the Bahlui River in Iaşi on 25 June 1821, Lieutenant Catakouzenos and his forces, originally stationed on the Russian frontier, crossed the Prut River.

Battle
The Ottomans possessed a military that outnumbered the Greeks at approximately ten to one. Catacouzenos imitated the retreat of Ypsilantis to the Austrian Empire after Dragashani, by fleeing to Russia. However, his forces, made up of around 500 young Greek soldiers (Edwin Emerson places the number at 400 soldiers), wanted to stay and fight against the Ottoman Empire. During the battle, approximately one-fourth of the Greek army fled by swimming across the Prut. The remaining soldiers continued to fight until they were either killed by the Ottomans or drowned in the river. The Russians, positioned on the opposite bank of the river, applauded the bravery of the Greeks. Giorgakis Olympios, a military leader who commanded an army in Wallachia, was garrisoned in the Moldavian Secu Monastery; Giorgakis fought until the Ottomans stormed the monastery and forced him to light powder kegs from which he perished in the explosion. However, Giorgakis had a Macedonian comrade by the name of Yiannis Pharmakis, who continued the fight for a fortnight longer. In the end, on 4 October 1821, Pharmakis surrendered on the promise that his life would be spared. The promise was not kept by the Ottomans, and Pharmakis was ultimately decapitated in Constantinople.

Aftermath
After the battle, all Greek uprisings in the Danubian Principalities and other northern areas subject to the Ottoman Empire ceased. However, the primary task, which was to divert significant Ottoman military forces at all costs towards the Northern Balkans, that would otherwise be used to fight and crush the Greek War of Independence in the South, was accomplished.

Citations

References

General references
 

Sculeni
Sculeni
Sculeni
Sculeni
History of Moldavia (1711–1822)
History of Wallachia (1714–1821)
Bessarabia Governorate
1821 in Europe
1821 in the Ottoman Empire
19th century in Moldavia
June 1821 events